The Carrier Corps was a labour corps created in Kenya during the First World War to provide military labour to support the British campaign against German army forces in East Africa.

Service
Whereas the Germans, commanded by Paul von Lettow-Vorbeck, armed and trained African Askaris to create an effective guerrilla force able to live off the land; the British attempted to deploy Indian Army troops under Jan Smuts and keep the King's African Rifles as internal security troops, with limited success.  Not only were they unused to the terrain, the need to feed a large body of foreign soldiers presented severe logistical problems, as troops in the interior had to be supplied over long distances without rail or road lines of communication. To deliver one kilogram of rice to the interior it could take 50 kilograms of rice at the coast—most of it being consumed en route to feed all the porters needed to carry it inland. The British Administration formed a military labour organisation, the Carrier Corps, which ultimately recruited or conscripted over 400,000 African men for porterage and other support tasks.

The effect on many of the native East African population, then still largely tribal, of being mobilised and then enduring considerable hardship for a remote and largely irrelevant foreign cause had significant effects in the long term, both highlighting the fallibility of the European presence in Africa (as armed Askaris readily killed white men), and raising the political awareness of Africans as to the need to stand up for their own interests. The organisation of the Carrier Corps was a remarkable feat of improvisation by a small number of officials of the East African Protectorate's administration, under a District Commissioner Lt Col Oscar Ferris Watkins. Watkins and his officials faced a constant struggle against his superior's excessive demands upon the Carriers and to conscript further native manpower.

Legacy
The Carrier Corps is commemorated on the War Memorials in Kenyatta Avenue, Nairobi and Jomo Kenyatta Avenue, Mombasa. The 14,000 men of the Northern Rhodesian contingent of the Carrier Corps are commemorated on the Mbala War Memorial at the entrance to the town of Mbala (formerly Abercorn) in Northern Zambia. They came from across the territory, with a large contingent from what was then Barotseland in North-Western Rhodesia. The Barotse were recruited by the British South Africa Company Native Commissioner, John Henry Venning, who marched with them to the East African border.

Several East African towns have quarters named after the carrier corps presumably because members of the corps were given housing in these places. Such quarters include Kariakor in Nairobi, Kariakor in Voi, Kariakoo in Dar es Salaam and also in Dodoma.

See also
 John Arthur (missionary)
 History of Kenya – Colonial History
 History of Tanzania – First World War
 I. T. A. Wallace-Johnson
 Frank Weston (bishop of Zanzibar)

References

Sources

External links
 Mahon Murphy: Carrier Corps, in: 1914-1918-online. International Encyclopedia of the First World War.

East African Campaign (World War I)
History of Kenya
Military units and formations of the British Army in World War I
Non-combatant military personnel